Carl Gottfried Wilhelm Taubert (23 March 1811 – 7 January 1891) was a German pianist, composer, and conductor, and the father of philologist and writer Emil Taubert.

Life
Born in Berlin, Taubert studied under Ludwig Berger (piano) and Bernhard Klein (composition). In 1831, he became assistant conductor and accompanist for Berlin court concerts. Between 1845 and 1848, he was music director of the Berlin Royal Opera and was also court conductor in Berlin from 1845 to 1869. From 1865, he taught music at the Prussian Academy of Arts; Theodor Kullak was one of his pupils.

His compositions include six operas, incidental music, four symphonies, concertos for piano and cello, four string quartets, other orchestral, choral, and piano works, and more than 300 songs. His early compositions were praised by the composer Felix Mendelssohn, who had also studied piano with Berger.

Taubert died in Berlin. His grave is preserved in the Protestant "Friedhof I der Jerusalems- und Neuen Kirchengemeinde" (Cemetery No. I of the congregations of Jerusalem's Church and New Church) in Berlin-Kreuzberg, south of Hallesches Tor.

Operas
 Die Kirmes, comic opera, libretto by Eduard Devrient, 23 January 1832, Berlin, Königliches Theater
 Die Zigeuner, libretto by E. Devrient, 14 September 1834, Berlin, Königliches Theater
 Marquis und Dieb, comic opera, libretto by L Schneider, 15 February 1842, Berlin, Königliches Theater
 Joggeli, libretto by H. Kloster, 9 October 1953, Berlin, Königliches Theater
 Macbeth, libretto by F. H. Eggers, 16 November 1857, Berlin, Königliches Theater
 Caesario, oder Was ihr wollt, comic opera, libretto by E. Taubert, 13 November 1874, Berlin, Königliches Theater

References
 Stanley Sadie (ed.): "Taubert, Wilhelm", in: The New Grove Dictionary of Opera (London: Macmillan, 1992),

External links

 Deutschen Nationalbibliothek catalogue information about the composer, accessed 18 November 2009
 

1811 births
1891 deaths
19th-century classical composers
19th-century German composers
19th-century conductors (music)
German classical pianists
German conductors (music)
German male classical composers
German male conductors (music)
German male pianists
German opera composers
German Romantic composers
Male classical pianists
Male opera composers
Pupils of Bernhard Klein
String quartet composers